Labrisomus socorroensis, the Misspelled blenny, is a species of labrisomid blenny endemic to the Revillagigedo Islands where they inhabit rocky areas at depths of from extremely shallow waters to .

Etymology
The common name of this species - "Misspelled blenny" - derives from the fact that when Clark Hubbs initially published the description of this species he named it "L. soccorroensis" after the location from which the type specimen was collected - Socorro Island.  However, a species named after Socorro Island should be named "socorroensis" and thus the blenny was "misspelled".

References

socorroensis
Fish described in 1953
Taxa named by Clark Hubbs